Adareil Airport  is an airport in Adareil, South Sudan.

References

Airports in South Sudan